Richard Jarvis (politician) is a former American politician from Idaho. Jarvis is a former Republican member of Idaho House of Representatives.

Early life 
On October 6, 1950, Jarvis was born in Boise, Idaho.

Education 
In 1974, Jarvis earned a Bachelor of Science degree in Business Management from Brigham Young University.

Career 
Jarvis was an insurance agent.

Elections

2010 
Jarvis was defeated by John Vander Woude in the Republican primary taking only 38.3% of the vote; Michael D. Roy also ran in the primary taking only 14.1% of the vote.

2008 
Jarvis defeated John Vander Woude in the Republican primary with 50.7% of the vote (65 votes). Jarvis defeated Democratic nominee Sharon L. Fisher with 64% of the vote.

Personal life 
Jarvis' wife is Mary. They have six children. Jarvis and his family live in Meridian, Idaho.

References

External links 
 Richard Jarvis at ballotpedia.org

Living people
Republican Party members of the Idaho House of Representatives
People from Boise, Idaho
1950 births